Madison Street Historic District may refer to:

 Madison Street Historic District (Clarksville, Tennessee), listed on the National Register of Historic Places (NRHP)
 Madison Street Historic District (Waukesha, Wisconsin), listed on the NRHP in Waukesha County, Wisconsin

See also
Madison Historic District (disambiguation)